The 2004 Euroleague Final Four was the concluding Euroleague Final Four tournament of the 2003–04 Euroleague season.

Bracket

Semifinals

Third place

Final

Awards

Euroleague Final Four MVP 
  Anthony Parker ( Maccabi Tel Aviv)

Euroleague Finals Top Scorer 
  Anthony Parker ( Maccabi Tel Aviv)
  Miloš Vujanić ( Skipper Bologna)

External links 
 2004 Final Four website

Final Four
2003–04
2003–04 in Israeli basketball
2003–04 in Russian basketball
2003–04 in Italian basketball
International basketball competitions hosted by Israel
Basketball, 2004 Euroleague Final Four
2000s in Tel Aviv